Hæstad Church is a parish church of the Church of Norway in Dønna Municipality in Nordland county, Norway. It is located in the village of Hestad on the southern part of the island of Dønna. It is one of the churches for the Dønna parish which is part of the Nord-Helgeland prosti (deanery) in the Diocese of Sør-Hålogaland. The white, wooden church was built in a long church style in 1913 using plans drawn up by the architect Victor Nordan, the son of Jacob Wilhelm Nordan. The church seats about 220 people and it holds worship services at Christmas and some Sundays in the summer.  The building was consecrated on 11 September 1913.

See also
List of churches in Sør-Hålogaland

References

Dønna
Churches in Nordland
Wooden churches in Norway
20th-century Church of Norway church buildings
Churches completed in 1913
1913 establishments in Norway
Long churches in Norway